2016 Thai League Division 1 (known as Yamaha League Division 1 for sponsorship reasons) was the 19th season of the League since its establishment in 1997. It is the feeder league for the Thai League T1. A total of 16 teams competed in the league this season.

Following the death of King Bhumibol Adulyadej, the Football Association of Thailand cancelled the remaining league season on 14 October 2016, with two rounds remaining.

Thai Honda were therefore crowned champions with Ubon UMT United and Port also promoted. Thai Honda and Ubon were already promoted before the announcement.

The following day however (15 October), FAT appeared to do a U-turn and announced that further discussions with key stake holders would determine whether the league campaign would continue. Although these discussions were predominantly on the back of PLT league clubs, the ruling could also effect the whole footballing structure.

On the 16 October, after a meeting of all top flight league clubs it was announced that the original decision to cancel the remaining games would stay in place, therefore crowning Thai Honda as champions.

Changes from last season

Team changes

From Division 1
Promoted to Thai League T1
 Pattaya United
 Sukhothai 
 BBCU

Relegated to Regional League Division 2
 Phichit
 Ayutthaya
 Phuket
 TTM
 Trat

To Division 1
Relegated from Thai League T1
 Port

Promoted from Regional League Division 2
 Ubon UMT United
 Khon Kaen United
 Rayong
 Lampang
|}

Withdrawn clubs

 Police United have withdrawn from the 2016 campaign due to financial problems.
 TOT   have withdrawn in the 2016 campaign due to financial problems.
 Khon Kaen United was suspended from the 2016 campaign due to criminal case with 8 games remaining

Teams

Stadium and locations

Personnel and sponsoring
Note: Flags indicate national team as has been defined under FIFA eligibility rules. Players may hold more than one non-FIFA nationality.

Foreign players
The number of foreign players is restricted to five per TPL team. A team can use four foreign players on the field in each game, including at least one player from the AFC country.

Results

League table

Positions by round

Result table

Season statistics

Top scorers
As of 24 September 2016.

Hat-tricks

Attendances

See also
 2016 Thai League
 2016 Regional League Division 2
 2016 Football Division 3
 2016 Thai FA Cup
 2016 Thai League Cup
 2016 Kor Royal Cup
 Thai Premier League All-Star Football

References

Thai League 2 seasons
2016 in Thai football leagues
T
T